Laura Ikauniece (formerly Laura Ikauniece-Admidiņa; born 31 May 1992) is a Latvian athlete competing in heptathlon. Participated in two Olympic Games. 2012 London Olympics 6414 points 7th place, 2016 Rio de Janeiro 6617 points 4th place. Her personal best and also the Latvian record is 6815 points, achieved in 2017 at Hypomeeting, Götzis. She achieved 6516 points at the 2015 World Championships, where she won a bronze medal. At the 2012 European Athletics Championships Ikauniece initially won a bronze medal, after a hard fight with fellow Latvian Aiga Grabuste, finishing 10 points in front of her. Later on she was awarded with silver medal, as a result of the disqualification of Ukrainian athlete Lyudmyla Yosypenko. 2019 European Indoor Championships (GBR) Laura set a new indoor pentathlon NR 4701 points 5th place. 

She studied at the University of Latvia (UL) Faculty of Education, Psychology and Art (FEPA).

Laura won a silver medal at the 2009 World Youth Championships in Brixen, Italy, reaching 5647 points. The next year she finished 6th in the World Junior Championships reaching 5618 points. In 2011 she won a bronze medal at the European Athletics Junior Championships. In 2015, she won bronze at the World Athletics Championships.

Achievements

Personal bests

Outdoor

Indoor

References

1992 births
Living people
Latvian heptathletes
People from Ventspils
Athletes (track and field) at the 2012 Summer Olympics
Athletes (track and field) at the 2016 Summer Olympics
Olympic athletes of Latvia
European Athletics Championships medalists
World Athletics Championships athletes for Latvia
World Athletics Championships medalists
Universiade medalists in athletics (track and field)
Universiade gold medalists for Latvia
Medalists at the 2013 Summer Universiade